Culcha Candela is a dancehall, hip hop, house and reggae group from Berlin, Germany. Sources say they formed at different times but in the range of 2001–2003. Their lyrics range from political issues, such as "Una Cosa" or "Schöne, neue Welt" to party songs, such as "Partybus". The name Culcha Candela can be translated into English roughly as "hot" or "bright" culture.

History
Culcha Candela themselves put their founding on 7 July 2002 through the Band Member Johnny Strange, Itchyban and Lafrotino. Little by little came also Larsito, Mr. Reedoo, Don Cali and DJ Chino to the band. The different origin of the Member is also reflected in the music so the Band Member rap and sing in English, German, Spanish and Patois In the years after that they made numerous concerts, in 2004 the debut album Union Verdadera was released, that also came in the German Charts.

The Band was together with Saïan Supa Crew, Gentleman and the Söhne Mannheims on Tour.
In May 2005 a remix of Sientelo, the reggaeton hit of the Puerto Rican Speedy and the US-singer Lumidee. On 12 September 2005 the second album was released, with the name Next Generation that was also the reason for the first own tour. It resembles the first one from the Style, so it was largely embossed by reggae.

On 10 August 2007 Hamma was released, the pre-single from their third album, "Culcha Candela", released on 31 August 2007. With the direct entry to 1st place on 24 August 2007 the band surprisingly achieved the greatest success of their career to date.
In the following six weeks they were able to successfully defend first place in the single charts. Hamma later also got Platinum A Hamma!-Tour followed in German-speaking countries. The second release from the album was  Ey DJ  on 23 November 2007. 
On 14 February 2008 the band represented their hometown Berlin with the song "Chica" at the Bundesvision Song Contest in the TUI Arena, in which they took seventh place.

On 28 August 2009 their fourth studio album was released Schöne Neue Welt, where they got 2011 Platinum in Germany and Gold in Switzerland. The album stayed in the German charts for over a year. In terms of style, it was based on its predecessor, there are party songs, serious songs, but also two ballads on it. The first single was the song of the same name, Schöne Neue Welt, which is about social, political development and environmental.
The Second Single Monsta was released on 22 October, it achieved gold in Germany and in Switzerland even Platinum.
The Third Single was  Eiskalt which was released on 19 March 2010. In Summer 2010 the fourth and final single Somma im Kiez was released.

In November 2010 Culcha Candela were on tour in Central America for three weeks at the invitation of the Goethe-Institut. In that year also Lafrontino left the Band.

On 22 October 2010 their first Best-Of album was released Das Beste, which includes songs from their four old albums, but also three new songs: Move It, Berlin City Girl and General. The first single that was released was Move It on 8 October and rose to number 7 in the German charts. The second release, on 14 January 2011, was  Berlin City Girl  as a Wir Edition Remix.

On 27 May they performed in the König-Pilsener-Arena in Oberhausen at the VIVA Comet 2011 award ceremony and also received the award in the Best Band category. After the award ceremony, they announced a new album for the end of the year, the first song of which they presented on their tour: Hungry Eyes.

The single Wildes Ding was released on 6 January 2012. The "jungle version" of the song was the theme song for RTL - Dschungelcamp 2012. On 8 March 2012 they started their 15-concert Flätrate Tour with a concert in Dresden and made three weeks later a Final concert in their hometown Berlin in front of about 7000 fans.

At the end of 2012 they announced that they would take a break next year, there should be no concerts and no new music should be released.
Instead, they wanted to work on solo projects. Larsito offered drum workshops and recorded an album called Etwas bleibt, Johnny Strange got involved with the organization Afrika Rise, Don Cali produced as Part of the project KAO Music, Chino and Itchy appeared as Itchinosound.
In June 2014 Itchyban released his solo album Unperfekt under his real first name Mateo on the label Warner.

On 15 May 2014 Culcha Candela officially announced that Larsito and Mr. Reedoo have left the band and now want to continue working solo.
At the beginning of 2015, the four remaining band members also announced the change to Warner Music and the release of a new album together in summer 2015. On 1 May 2015 they released the song La Noche Entera, which premiered as a pre-single exclusively on their Facebook page. On 5 June their first official single Wayne (feat. Curlyman) was released from the new album Candelistan, which was released on 28 August 2015.

Discography

Studio albums

Live albums

Compilation albums

References

External links

 Culcha Candela Official Website
 Culcha Candela Fan Website
   Culcha Candela interview with Big Up! Magazine

German hip hop groups
Musical groups established in 2001
Participants in the Bundesvision Song Contest
Musical groups from Berlin